= Research Atlanta =

Non-profit research organization that studied policy in Atlanta, Georgia, USA

Research Atlanta, Inc.
- Merged into: Civic League for Regional Atlanta
- Formation: 1971
- Dissolved: 2006; 20 years ago
- Location: Atlanta, Georgia

Formed in 1971, Research Atlanta was a non-profit organization established to study public policy issues affecting the Atlanta metropolitan area. Research Atlanta served as Atlanta's think tank for urban problems and published policy studies from 1971 to 2006 on major urban issues confronted by metropolitan Atlanta and placed Atlanta's urban problems within a national context. During its 35 years of operation Research Atlanta produced numerous public policy studies on issues ranging from public school desegregation to creating a downtown cultural district. In 1992, Georgia State University agreed to assume responsibility for operating Research Atlanta. In 2006, Research Atlanta merged with the Regional Leadership Forum and the Metro Group to form what is now the Civic League for Regional Atlanta.
